The 1994 Benson and Hedges Open was a men's professional tennis tournament held in Auckland, New Zealand that was part of the World Series of the 1994 ATP Tour. It was the 27th edition of the tournament and was held from 10 January through 17 January 1994. First-seeded Magnus Gustafsson won the singles title.

Finals

Singles

 Magnus Gustafsson defeated  Patrick McEnroe 6–4, 6–0
 It was Gustafsson's 1st title of the year and the 6th of his career.

Doubles

 Patrick McEnroe /  Jared Palmer defeated  Grant Connell /  Patrick Galbraith 6–2, 4–6, 6–4
 It was McEnroe's 1st title of the year and the 13th of his career. It was Palmer's 1st title of the year and the 3rd of his career.

References

External links
 
 ATP tournament profile
 ITF tournament edition details

Heineken Open
Heineken Open
ATP Auckland Open
January 1994 sports events in New Zealand